is a passenger railway station located in the city of Uwajima, Ehime Prefecture, Japan. It is operated by JR Shikoku and has the station number "U24".

Lines
Only local trains serve the station. Connections with other services are needed to travel further east of Matsuyama on the line.

Layout
The station, which is unstaffed, consists of an island platform serving two tracks. A small station building beside the tracks serves as a waiting room. Access to the island platform is by means of ramps and a level crossing. Several sidings and passing loops branch off the tracks on either side of the platform.

History
The Uwajima Line and its stations, including Tachima, then became part of the Yosan Mainline from that date. At that time, the station was operated by Japanese Government Railways (JGR), later becoming Japanese National Railways (JNR). With the privatization of JNR on 1 April 1987, control of the station passed to JR Shikoku.

Surrounding area
 Hoketsu Pass 
 Tatsuma Ekimae Bus Stop
 Tatsuma Post Office.

See also
 List of railway stations in Japan

References

External links
Station timetable

Railway stations in Ehime Prefecture
Railway stations in Japan opened in 1941
Uwajima, Ehime